Fred Kent is the founder and president of the nonprofit organization Project for Public Spaces. The organization is dedicated to creating public places that foster communities.

He studied with Margaret Mead and worked with William H. Whyte on the "Street Life Project," assisting in observations and film analysis of corporate plazas, urban streets, parks, and other open spaces in New York City.

In 1968, Kent founded the Academy for Black and Latin Education (ABLE), a street academy for high school dropouts. He was Program Director for the Mayor's Council on the Environment in New York City under Mayor John Lindsay. In 1970, and again in 1990, Kent was the coordinator and chairman of New York City's Earth Day.

Kent is also an avid photographer, shooting thousands of photographs of public spaces and their users.

Education 
He attended Columbia University, where he studied geography, economics, transportation, planning, and anthropology.

References

 Project for Public Spaces
 2000 profile from The Town Paper

External links 
 Listen to an interview with Fred Kent on CBC’s "The Current," October 24, 2005

"Some exciting new solutions to bad city planning and urban design are being discussed this week in Regina. It's called "Building Our Communities: A National Conference on Community Sustainability." One of the speakers is Fred Kent. His company, the New York-based Project For Public Spaces, teaches cities how to create a sense of place within their bleaker blocks. For instance he's responsible for the redesign of Bryant Park in front of the New York Public Library. It used to be a haven for drug dealers and thieves and now it's a hugely popular public gathering spot."

American urban planners
Columbia University alumni
Year of birth missing (living people)
Living people